Harry Kershaw was a professional rugby league footballer who played in the 1890s and 1900s.

Playing career

Drop-goals (field-goals)
Harry Kershaw appears to have scored no drop-goals (or field-goals as they are currently known in Australasia), but prior to the 1974–75 season all goals, whether; conversions, penalties, or drop-goals, scored 2-points, consequently prior to this date drop-goals were often not explicitly documented, therefore '0' drop-goals may indicate drop-goals not recorded, rather than no drop-goals scored. In addition, prior to the 1949–50 season, the archaic field-goal was also still a valid means of scoring points.

References

External links

 Search for "Kershaw" at rugbyleagueproject.org

Place of birth missing
Place of death missing
Rugby league fullbacks
Rugby league five-eighths
Rugby league halfbacks
English rugby league players
Wakefield Trinity players
Year of birth missing
Year of death missing